Pskov, known at various times as the Principality of Pskov or the Pskov Republic, was a medieval state on the south shore of Lake Pskov. Originally a principality and then a part of the Novgorod Republic, Pskov became an independent republic in 1348. Its territory was roughly equivalent to the modern Pskov Oblast of Russia. Its capital city was Pskov.

Origin 

As a principality, Pleskov (old name of Pskov) was ruled by separate princes, but often it was ruled directly from Novgorod until the mid-13th century when the city began accepting as rulers princes exiled from their possessions. Each exiled prince that went to Pleskov could be proclaimed prince there (if the principal throne wasn't already occupied by another prince). In any case, he could at least get an honorary reception and live there without fear for his life.

After the disintegration of Kievan Rus' in the 12th century, the city of Pskov with its surrounding territories along the Velikaya River, Lake Peipus, Pskovskoye Lake and Narva River became part of the Novgorod Republic. It kept its special autonomous rights, including the right for independent construction of suburbs (Izborsk is the most ancient among them). Due to Pskov's leading role in the struggle against the Livonian Order, its influence spread significantly. The long reign of Daumantas (1266–99) and especially his victory in the Battle of Rakvere (1268) ushered in the period of Pskov's actual independence. The Novgorod boyars formally recognized Pskov's independence in the Treaty of Bolotovo (1348), relinquishing their right to appoint the posadniks of Pskov.

Relationship with Lithuania and Moscow

For the most part of 14th century, and especially after separating from Novgorod, Pskov was in the sphere of influence of the Grand Duchy of Lithuania. This changed after Grand Duke Vytautas of Lithuania signed the Treaty of Salynas with the Livonian Order, promising to help the Order with conquering Pskov in exchange for the Order's support elsewhere. Prince Ivan Andreyevich left the city and Pskov sent emissaries to Grand Duke Vasily I of Moscow asking for one of his vassal rulers to be the new prince of Pskov. It remained dependent on Moscow until the end of Pskov Republic in 1510, helping Moscow in its conflicts with Lithuania and Novgorod.

Internal organization 
The Pskov Republic had well-developed farming, fishing, blacksmithing, jewellery-making and construction industries. Exchange of commodities within the republic itself and its trade with Novgorod and other Russian cities, the Baltic region, and Western European cities made Pskov one of the biggest handicraft and trade centers of Rus'. As opposed to the Novgorod Republic, Pskov never had big feudal landowners: estates were smaller and even more scattered than of those in Novgorod. The estates of Pskovian monasteries and churches were much smaller as well. Some land was owned by smerds while other izorniki did not own the land they worked and were obliged to pay rent – between a quarter and a half of the harvest. A farmer who had no debts to his landlord could leave him only on a certain day of the year.

The government of the Pskov Republic consisted of the veche (popular assembly), posadnichestvo (mayoralty) and the prince (directly or through a viceroy). Mayors (posadniki) from all parts of the city, together with one or more Lord Mayors and former mayors formed the Council of Lords (sovet gospod, boyarskiy sovet) which was the main executive organ of the state. The offices of mayors (posadniki) became a privilege of several noble (boyar) families.

The veche had legislative powers, it could appoint military commanders and hear ambassadors' reports. It also approved expenses such as grants to princes and payments to builders of walls, towers and bridges. Veche gathered at the Trinity Cathedral, which held the archives of the veche and important private papers and state documents. The veche assembly included posadniks, "middle" and common people. The historians differ on the extent to which the veche was dominated by the elites, with some saying that the real power was in the hands of boyars and others considering veche a democratic institution.

Conflicts were common and the confrontation between the veche and the posadniks in 1483–1484 led to the execution of one posadnik and to the confiscation of property of three other posadniks who fled to Moscow. The power of the prince was limited but – in contrast to the Novgorod Republic – he still retained important administrative and judicial functions, the latter carried out jointly with the posadnik. The socio-economic and political life of the Pskovian land were reflected in the Legal Code of Pskov.

Pskov was divided into several parts, called ends (kontsy). There were four ends in the 14th century, as the city was growing and a new wall was constructed in 1465 the new ends were created. Each end had its own central church which housed the archive, treasury and refectory where holiday feasts were held. The ends played a prominent role in the government: often delegations sent by Pskov had representatives from all the ends and each end administered a part of territory of the republic outside of the capital city.

Pskov remained dependent on Novgorod in ecclesiastical matters during the republican period. The strigolniki religious sect was active in the city in second half of the 14th century and the beginning of the 15th century.

Trade and economy 

Pskov, along with Novgorod, was an important centre of trade between Russia and Western Europe. Already in the 13th century German merchants were present in Zapskovye area of Pskov and the Hanseatic League had a trading post in the same area in the first half of 16th century which moved to Zavelichye after a fire in 1562. Pskov's main trade partners were Riga, Reval and Dorpat. The wars with Livonian Order, Poland-Lithuania and Sweden interrupted the trade but it was maintained until the 17th century, with Swedish merchants gaining the upper hand eventually.

Culture 

Pskov churches feature many distinctive elements: corbel arches, church porches, exterior galleries and zvonnitsa bell towers. These features were introduced by Pskov masons to Muscovy, where they constructed numerous buildings during the 15th and 16th centuries. Out of all non-religious construction, only the fortresses in Pskov, Izborsk and Gdov have survived.The literature of Pskov land was an integral part of the medieval Russian literature. The chronicle-writing started in 13th century, at first dealing mostly with topics of local interest. By the 15th century the chronicles became more detailed and described events in Muscovy, Novgorod, Lithuania and the Golden Horde. The most important works written in Pskov are the Story of Dovmont describing the coming of Dovmont to the city, his baptism and subsequent victories, The Life of Saint Euphrosynus and The Address of Hegumen Pamfil which contains one of the earliest descriptions of Ivan Kupala rituals.

The downfall of Pskov is recounted in the Story of the Taking of Pskov (1510), which was lauded by D. S. Mirsky as "one of the most beautiful short stories of Old Russia. The history of the Muscovites' leisurely perseverance is told with admirable simplicity and art. An atmosphere of descending gloom pervades the whole narrative: all is useless, and whatever the Pskovites can do, the Muscovite cat will take its time and eat the mouse when and how it pleases".

Final years 

In 1501, armies of Pskov and Moscow were defeated in the Battle of the Siritsa River by the Livonian Order, but the city withstood a subsequent siege.

In 1510, Grand Prince of Moscow Vasili III arrived in Pskov and pronounced it his votchina, thus putting an end to the Pskov Republic and its autonomous rights. The city's ruling body, the veche, was dissolved and some 300 families of rich Pskovians were deported from the city. Their estates were distributed among the Muscovite service class people. From that time on, the city of Pskov and the lands around it continued to develop as a part of the centralized Russian state, preserving some of its economic and cultural traditions.

Princes of Pskov
 1342–1349 Andrei of Polotsk (Gedeminids)
 1349–1360 Eustaphy Feodorovich (Prince of Izborsk)
 1360–1369 Alexander of Polotsk
 1375–1377 Matvei
 1377–1399 Andrei of Polotsk
 1386–1394 Ivan Andreyevich
 1399–1510 viceroys of the Grand Duchy of Moscow

References

Sources 

 Масленникова Н. Н. Присоединения Пскова к Русскому централизованному государству. Leningrad, 1955.

Further reading 
 The Chronicles of Pskov, vol. 1–2. Moscow–Leningrad, 1941–55.
 Валеров А. В. Новгород и Псков: Очерки политической истории Северо-Западной Руси XI—XIV вв. Moscow: Aleteia, 2004. .

 
Former principalities
Former republics
History of Pskov
History of the Rus' people
Russian city-states
States and territories disestablished in the 1230s
States and territories established in 1348
Trading posts of the Hanseatic League